This is a list of college and university museums in the United States.

Alabama 

 Alabama Museum of Health Sciences
 Alabama Stage and Screen Hall of Fame
Evelyn Burrow Museum at Wallace State Community College
 Gorgas House
 Jule Collins Smith Museum of Fine Art
 Kathryn Tucker Windham Museum
 Paul W. Bryant Museum
 Southern Environmental Center
 Tuskegee Institute National Historic Site

Alaska 

 University of Alaska Museum of the North

Arizona 

 Arizona State Museum
 Arizona State University Art Museum
 Center for Creative Photography
 Center for Meteorite Studies
Louis Carlos Bernal Gallery
 University of Arizona Mineral Museum
 University of Arizona Museum of Art

Arkansas 

 Japanese American Internment Museum
 Lakeport Plantation
 Pfeiffer House and Carriage House
 Physical Education Building (Arkansas Tech University)

California 

 Academy of Art University Automobile Museum
 Art, Design & Architecture Museum
 Benton Museum of Art
 Berkeley Art Museum and Pacific Film Archive
 Bohart Museum of Entomology
 University of California Museum of Paleontology
 California Social Work Hall of Distinction
 De Saisset Museum
 Entomology Research Museum
 Essig Museum of Entomology
 Euphrat Museum of Art
 Fowler Museum at UCLA
 Frederick R. Weisman Museum of Art (California)
 Fullerton Arboretum
 Hammer Museum
 Humboldt State University Natural History Museum
 Cantor Arts Center
 Jesse Peter Museum
 Lawrence Hall of Science
 Magnes Collection of Jewish Art and Life
 Museum of Vertebrate Zoology
Natural History Museum at Sierra College
 Phoebe A. Hearst Museum of Anthropology
 Robert and Frances Fullerton Museum of Art
 UC Santa Cruz Coastal Science Campus
 UCLA Meteorite Collection
 UCR/California Museum of Photography
 USC Fisher Museum of Art
 USC Pacific Asia Museum

Colorado 

 Koshare Indian Museum and Dancers
Louden-Henritze Archaeology Museum
Mines Museum of Earth Science
 University of Colorado Museum of Natural History

Connecticut 

 Ballard Institute and Museum of Puppetry
 Connecticut State Museum of Natural History
 Davison Art Center
 Fairfield University Art Museum
 Housatonic Museum of Art
 Ireland's Great Hunger Museum
 J. Robert Donnelly Husky Heritage Sports Museum
 Peabody Museum of Natural History
 William Benton Museum of Art
 Yale Center for British Art
 Yale University Art Gallery
 Yale University Collection of Musical Instruments

Delaware 

 University Museums at the University of Delaware

District of Columbia 
American University Museum
 George Washington University Art Galleries
 National Deaf Life Museum at Gallaudet University
 Textile Museum (George Washington University)

Florida 

 Alexander Brest Museum and Gallery
 Carnegie Library at FAMU
 Child of the Sun
 Family Heritage House Museum
 Florida International Museum
 Florida Museum of Natural History
 Freedom Tower (Miami)
 Frost Art Museum
 Gillespie Museum
 Jacksonville University Life Sciences Museum
 John and Mable Ringling Museum of Art
 Leepa-Rattner Museum of Art
 Lowe Art Museum
 Mary McLeod Bethune Home
 Museum of Contemporary Art Jacksonville
 Museum of Florida Art and Culture
 Rollins Museum of Art
 Ruth Funk Center for Textile Arts
 Samuel P. Harn Museum of Art
 Union Bank (Tallahassee, Florida)
 University of South Florida Contemporary Art Museum
 Wolfsonian-FIU

Georgia 

 Michael C. Carlos Museum
 Georgia Museum of Art
 Georgia Museum of Natural History
 Georgia Southern Museum
 Oak Hill & The Martha Berry Museum
 Old Governor's Mansion (Milledgeville, Georgia)
 Robert C. Williams Paper Museum
 SCAD Museum of Art
 Spelman College Museum of Fine Art

Hawaii 

 John Young Museum of Art

Idaho 

 Herrett Center for Arts and Science
 Orma J. Smith Museum of Natural History

Illinois 

 Museum of Contemporary Photography
 Cuneo Museum
 Hull House
 Illinois Natural History Survey
 Krannert Art Museum
Koehnline Museum of Art at Oakton Community College
 Loyola University Museum of Art
 Mary and Leigh Block Museum of Art
 James Millikin House
 Renaissance Society
 Smart Museum of Art
 Sousa Archives and Center for American Music
 Spertus Institute for Jewish Learning and Leadership
 Spurlock Museum
 The Block Museum of Art at Northwestern University
 University Museum (Southern Illinois University Carbondale)
 Oriental Institute (Chicago)
 William and Florence Schmidt Art Center

Indiana 

 Brauer Museum of Art
 David Owsley Museum of Art
 Eskenazi Museum of Art
 Glenn A. Black Laboratory of Archaeology
 National Art Museum of Sport
 Snite Museum of Art

Iowa 

 Brunnier Art Museum
 Christian Petersen Art Museum
 The Farm House (Knapp–Wilson House)
 Figge Art Museum
 Harlan–Lincoln House
 Palmer Museum of Chiropractic History
 B.J. Palmer House
 University of Iowa Athletics Hall of Fame
 University of Iowa Museum of Natural History
 University of Iowa Stanley Museum of Art

Kansas 

 Gordon Parks Museum
Lowell D. Holmes Museum of Anthropology
 Marianna Kistler Beach Museum of Art
 McPherson Museum
 Nerman Museum of Contemporary Art
 Old Castle Hall
 Robert J. Dole Institute of Politics
 Spencer Museum of Art
 Sternberg Museum of Natural History
 University of Kansas Natural History Museum

Kentucky 

 Cumberland Inn & Museum
 Kentucky Folk Art Center
 Kentucky Museum
 University of Kentucky Art Museum

Louisiana 

 Paul and Lulu Hilliard University Art Museum
 Louisiana Center for Women in Government and Business Hall of Fame
 Louisiana Museum of Natural History
 LSU Museum of Art
 LSU Rural Life Museum
 Meadows Museum of Art
 Newcomb Art Museum
 Ogden Museum of Southern Art
 Shaw Center for the Arts

Maine 

 Bates College Museum of Art
 Bowdoin College Museum of Art
 Hudson Museum
 Northern Maine Museum of Science
 Page Farm & Home Museum
 Peary–MacMillan Arctic Museum
 University of Maine Museum of Art

Maryland 

 Center for Art, Design and Visual Culture
 Evergreen Museum & Library
 Homewood Museum
 St. Mary's College of Maryland
 University of Maryland School of Nursing Living History Museum
 The Art Gallery at the University of Maryland

Massachusetts 

 Amherst Center for Russian Culture
 Arthur M. Sackler Museum
 Beneski Museum of Natural History
 Barnum Museum of Natural History
 Busch-Reisinger Museum
 Davis Museum at Wellesley College
 Dumbarton Oaks
 Emily Dickinson Museum
 Fogg Art Museum
 General Artemas Ward House
 Harvard Art Museums
 Harvard Mineralogical Museum
 Harvard Museum of Natural History
 Harvard Museum of the Ancient Near East
 Harvard University Herbaria
 List Visual Arts Center
 McMullen Museum of Art
 Mead Art Museum
 MIT Museum
 Mount Holyoke College Art Museum
 Museum of Comparative Zoology
 Peabody Museum of Archaeology and Ethnology
 Pioneer Village (Salem, Massachusetts)
 Rose Art Museum
 Smith College Museum of Art
 University Museum (Harvard University)
 University Museum of Contemporary Art
 Warren Anatomical Museum
 Williams College Museum of Art

Michigan 

 Dennos Museum Center
 Eli and Edythe Broad Art Museum
 Finnish American Heritage Center
 Great Lakes Quilt Center
 Jim Crow Museum of Racist Memorabilia
 Kalamazoo Valley Museum
 Kelsey Museum of Archaeology
 Kruizenga Art Museum
 Marshall M. Fredericks Sculpture Museum
 Meadow Brook Hall
 A. E. Seaman Mineral Museum
 Sindecuse Museum of Dentistry
 Stearns Collection of Musical Instruments
 University of Michigan Museum of Art
 University of Michigan Museum of Natural History
 William L. Clements Library

Minnesota 

 American Museum of Asmat Art
 Bell Museum of Natural History
 Glensheen Historic Estate
 Goldstein Museum of Design
 SMSU Art Museum
 SMSU Museum of Indigenous Americans
 SMSU Museum of Natural History
 Tweed Museum of Art
 Weisman Art Museum

Mississippi 

 University of Mississippi Museum

Missouri 

 Arthur F. McClure II Archives and University Museum
 Mildred Lane Kemper Art Museum
 Museum of Art and Archaeology
 Museum of Contemporary Religious Art
 National Churchill Museum
 National Museum of Toys and Miniatures
 Ralph Foster Museum
 Rosemary Berkel and Harry L. Crisp II Museum
 Saint Louis University Museum of Art
 Samuel Cupples House
 St. Louis Mercantile Library
 State Historical Society of Missouri

Montana 

 Montana Museum of Art & Culture
 Museum of the Rockies
 Philip L. Wright Zoological Museum
 SpectrUM Discovery Area

Nebraska 

 George W. Frank House
 Great Plains Art Museum
 International Quilt Museum
 Lentz Center for Asian Culture
 Lester F. Larsen Tractor Museum
 Museum of Nebraska Art
 Sheldon Museum of Art
 University of Nebraska State Museum

Nevada 

 Marjorie Barrick Museum of Art
 W. M. Keck Earth Science and Mineral Engineering Museum

New Hampshire 

 Hood Museum of Art
 Museum of the White Mountains

New Jersey 

 Geology Hall, New Brunswick, New Jersey
 New Jersey Museum of Agriculture
 Princeton University Art Museum
 Zimmerli Art Museum at Rutgers University

New Mexico 

 Blackwater Draw Museum
 Fleming Hall
 Harwood Museum of Art
 Institute of American Indian Arts
 Maxwell Museum of Anthropology
Mesalands Community College's Dinosaur Museum
Museum of Southwestern Biology
 University of New Mexico Art Museum
 Western Heritage Museum & Lea County Cowboy Hall of Fame

New York 

 Alfred Ceramic Art Museum
 American Merchant Marine Museum
 Anya and Andrew Shiva Art Gallery
 Casa Italiana Zerilli-Marimò
 Castellani Art Museum
 Center for Curatorial Studies, Bard College
 Children's Museum of Science and Technology
 Cooper Union
 Fordham Museum of Greek, Etruscan and Roman Art
 Fort Schuyler
 Frances Lehman Loeb Art Center
 The Frances Young Tang Teaching Museum and Art Gallery
 Godwin-Ternbach Museum
 Graduate Center, CUNY
 Grey Art Gallery
 Herbert F. Johnson Museum of Art
 Hostos Center for the Arts & Culture
 Institute for the Study of the Ancient World
 La Maison Française (New York University)
 Longyear Museum of Anthropology
Mercer Gallery at Monroe Community College
 Memorial Art Gallery
 Munson-Williams-Proctor Arts Institute
 The Museum at FIT
 The New School
 Parsons School of Design
 Picker Art Gallery
 Plattsburgh State Art Museum
Plaza Art Gallery
 Pratt Institute
 Ruth and Elmer Wellin Museum of Art
 Science Discovery Center of Oneonta
 University Art Museum at University at Albany
 West Point Museum
 Yager Museum of Art & Culture
 Yeshiva University Museum

North Carolina 

 Ackland Art Museum
 Duke Homestead and Tobacco Factory
 Morehead Planetarium and Science Center
 Nasher Museum of Art
 North Carolina State University Insect Museum
 Weatherspoon Art Museum

North Dakota 

 North Dakota Museum of Art

Ohio 

 Allen Memorial Art Museum
 Billy Ireland Cartoon Library & Museum
 Dittrick Museum of Medical History
 Frank Museum of Art
 Karl Limper Geology Museum
 Kennedy Museum of Art
 McDonough Museum of Art
 Miami University Art Museum
 Richard Ross Museum of Art
 Springfield Center for the Arts at Wittenberg University
 University of Findlay's Mazza Museum
 William H. McGuffey House

Oklahoma 

 A. D. Buck Museum of Science and History
 Fred Jones Jr. Museum of Art
 National Wrestling Hall of Fame and Museum
 Sam Noble Oklahoma Museum of Natural History

Oregon 

 The Art Gym
 Hallie Ford Museum of Art
 Horner Museum
 Jensen Arctic Museum
 Jordan Schnitzer Museum of Art
 Kathrin Cawein Gallery of Art
 Pacific University Museum
 Prewitt–Allen Archaeological Museum
 University of Oregon Museum of Natural and Cultural History

Pennsylvania 

 Elmer H. Grimm Sr. Pharmacy Museum
 Frick Fine Arts Building
 Frost Entomological Museum
 Institute of Contemporary Art, Philadelphia
 Kelso Bible Lands Museum
 La Salle University Art Museum
 Miller ICA at Carnegie Mellon University
 Nationality Rooms
 Palmer Museum of Art
 Pennsylvania Academy of the Fine Arts
 Robot Hall of Fame
 Salk Hall
 Schisler Museum of Wildlife & Natural History and McMunn Planetarium
 Stephen Foster Memorial
 University of Pennsylvania Museum of Archaeology and Anthropology

Rhode Island 

 Annmary Brown Memorial
 Haffenreffer Museum of Anthropology
 Naval War College Museum
 Rhode Island School of Design Museum

South Carolina 

 Fort Hill (Clemson, South Carolina)
 Halsey Institute of Contemporary Art
 Hanover House (Clemson)
 Upcountry History Museum

South Dakota 

 Museum of Geology
 National Music Museum

Tennessee 

 Abraham Lincoln Library and Museum
 Art Museum of the University of Memphis
 Belmont Mansion (Tennessee)
 Chucalissa
 Lynn H. Wood Archaeological Museum
 McClung Museum of Natural History and Culture
 President Andrew Johnson Museum and Library

Texas 

 Blaffer Art Museum
 Blanton Museum of Art
 Centennial Museum and Chihuahuan Desert Gardens
 Dishman Art Museum
 Dolph Briscoe Center for American History
 H.J. Lutcher Stark Center for Physical Culture and Sports
 Harry Ransom Center
 Institute of Texan Cultures
 J. Wayne Stark Galleries
 Lubbock Lake Landmark
 Mayborn Museum Complex
 Meadows Museum
 Museum of Texas Tech University
 National Ranching Heritage Center
 Old Stone Fort Museum (Texas)
 Panhandle–Plains Historical Museum
 The Pearce Collections at Navarro College
 Sanders Corps of Cadets Center
 Spindletop-Gladys City Boomtown Museum
 Texas Memorial Museum
 Woodland (Huntsville, Texas)

Utah 

 Brigham Young University Museum of Art
 Brigham Young University Museum of Peoples and Cultures
 BYU Museum of Paleontology
 Education in Zion Gallery
 Nora Eccles Harrison Museum of Art
 Monte L. Bean Life Science Museum
 Natural History Museum of Utah
 Southern Utah Museum of Art
 USU Eastern Prehistoric Museum
 USU Museum of Anthropology
 Utah Museum of Fine Arts

Vermont 

 Fleming Museum of Art
 Middlebury College Museum of Art
 Sullivan Museum and History Center

Virginia 

 Anderson Gallery
 Eleanor D. Wilson Museum
 Fralin Museum of Art
 Highland (James Monroe house)
 Institute for Contemporary Art, Richmond
 Kluge-Ruhe Aboriginal Art Collection
 Lee Chapel
 Longwood Center for the Visual Arts
 Maier Museum of Art at Randolph College
 McCormick Observatory
 Gari Melchers Home & Studio
 Muscarelle Museum of Art
 Pantops Farm

Washington 

 Burke Museum of Natural History and Culture
 Henry Art Gallery
 Slater Museum of Natural History

West Virginia 

 Art Museum of West Virginia University
 Jackson's Mill
 The Royce J. and Caroline B. Watts Museum

Wisconsin 

 Barlow Planetarium
 Chazen Museum of Art
 Thomas A. Greene Memorial Museum
 Grohmann Museum
 Patrick and Beatrice Haggerty Museum of Art
 L. R. Ingersoll Physics Museum
 Logan Museum of Anthropology
 UW–Madison Geology Museum
 Weis Earth Science Museum
 Wright Museum of Art

Wyoming 

 Tate Geological Museum
University of Wyoming Anthropology Museum
 University of Wyoming Art Museum
 University of Wyoming Geological Museum
Werner Wildlife Museum

References 

University
University museums in the United States
Art museums and galleries in the United States
Natural history museums in the United States
Science museums in the United States
History museums in the United States
Museums
Lists of art museums and galleries